Seventeenth Army or 17th Army may refer to:

Germany
 17th Army (German Empire), a World War I field Army
 17th Army (Wehrmacht), a World War II field army

Others
 Seventeenth Army (Japan)
 Japanese Seventeenth Area Army during World War II (see List of Armies of the Japanese Army)
 17th Army (Soviet Union)